Winthrow-Melhase Block, also known as Stevens Hotel, was built in 1906 in Klamath Falls, Oregon.  It was listed on the National Register of Historic Places in 1982. The building was severely damaged by the 1993 Klamath Falls earthquakes, and was subsequently demolished.

References

Italianate architecture in Oregon
Hotel buildings completed in 1906
National Register of Historic Places in Klamath County, Oregon
Hotels in Oregon
Buildings and structures in Klamath County, Oregon
1906 establishments in Oregon